Arsen Abramovich Beglaryan (born 18 February 1993) is an Armenian football player who plays as a goalkeeper for the Armenia national football team and Urartu.

Club career
Arsen Beglaryan was born in Krasnodar, Russia. He played goalkeeper for the youth teams of Kuban Krasnodar and Krasnodar during his early career.

Although he received many offers from Russian clubs, Beglaryan joined Armenian club Gandzasar Kapan on January 1, 2012  in order to get more practice. The contact with Gandzasar will expire on June 30, 2014. He was the second candidate from Gandzasar to be nominated for the Armenian Footballer of the Year award in 2012.

On 5 February 2020, FC Urartu announced the singing of Beglaryan.

International career
Beglaryan was invited into the Armenia national football team in early September 2012. He debuted for the national team on February 5, 2013 in a friendly match against Luxembourg in Valence, France. His first start was for Armenia's friendlies in the United States against Guatemala and El Salvador. His first start in an official tournament was against Denmark on September 4, 2016. He saved a penalty from Christian Eriksen and a subsequent rebound.

References

External links

1993 births
Living people
Sportspeople from Krasnodar
Russian sportspeople of Armenian descent
Citizens of Armenia through descent
Armenian footballers
Armenia international footballers
Armenia under-21 international footballers
Association football goalkeepers
Armenian expatriate footballers
Russian emigrants to Armenia
Expatriate footballers in Latvia
Expatriate footballers in Belarus
Armenian Premier League players
FC Krasnodar players
FC Gandzasar Kapan players
FC Shirak players
Ulisses FC players
FC Mika players
FC Alashkert players
FK Liepāja players
FC Dnyapro Mogilev players
FC Urartu players